The 2008 Six-red Snooker International (also known as the 2008 SangSom 6-red Snooker International for promotional and marketing purposes) was a six-red snooker tournament that took place between 8 and 13 July 2008 at the Montien Riverside Hotel in Bangkok, Thailand.

Twenty-one of the tournament's 48 competitors were currently on the 2008/09 main tour of the more established 15-reds game, including former world champions Peter Ebdon and Ken Doherty, 2007 finalist Mark Selby and the hugely successful Jimmy White. A relatively high proportion of competitors were from Asia.


Round-robin stage
The top four players from each group qualified for the knock-out stage. All matches were best of 9 frames.

Group A

 Jimmy White 5–0 Martin Gould 	
 Issara Kachaiwong 2–5 Aditya Mehta
 Mark Selby 5–0 Gregory Kopec
 Jimmy White 1–5 Gregory Kopec
 Issara Kachaiwong 4–5 Martin Gould
 Aditya Mehta 5–4 Gregory Kopec
 Mark Selby 4–5 Jimmy White
 Aditya Mehta 4–5 Martin Gould
 Issara Kachaiwong 4–5 Jimmy White
 Mark Selby 5–3 Martin Gould
 Issara Kachaiwong 5–3 Gregory Kopec
 Mark Selby	5–2 Aditya Mehta
 Mark Selby 5–3 Issara Kachaiwong
 Jimmy White 5–4 Aditya Mehta
 Gregory Kopec	0–5 Martin Gould

Group B

 Yasin Merchant 4–5 Keith Boon
 Thepchaiya Un-Nooh 5–0 Au Chi Wai
 Keith Boon 5–0 Stuart Pettman
 Peter Ebdon 5–0 Yasin Merchant
 Thepchaiya Un-Nooh 5–0 Stuart Pettman
 Au Chi Wai 5–2 Keith Boon
 Yasin Merchant 3–5 Stuart Pettman
 Peter Ebdon 5–2 Au Chi Wai
 Peter Ebdon 5–4 Thepchaiya Un-Nooh
 Peter Ebdon 5–4 Keith Boon
 Au Chi Wai 0–5 Stuart Pettman
 Thepchaiya Un-Nooh 5–0 Yasin Merchant
 Peter Ebdon 3–5 Stuart Pettman
 Au Chi Wai 5–4 Yasin Merchant
 Thepchaiya Un-Nooh 4–5 Keith Boon'

Group C

 Nguyen Nat Thanh 1–5 Ian Wells	
 Supoj Saenla 5–3 Chan Wok Ming	
 Ken Doherty 2–5 Mark Davis
 Supoj Saenla 5–0 Nguyen Nat Thanh	
 Chan Wok Ming 5–2 Ian Wells	
 Supoj Saenla 5–1 Ian Wells	
 Ken Doherty 5–3 Nguyen Nat Thanh	
 Chan Wok Ming 2–5	Mark Davis	
 Ken Doherty 3–5 Chan Wok Ming	
 Nguyen Nat Thanh 1–5 Mark Davis	
 Ken Doherty 5–0 Ian Wells	
 Nguyen Nat Thanh 0–5 Chan Wok Ming	
 Supoj Saenla 4–5 Mark Davis	
 Ken Doherty 5–4	Supoj Saenla	
 Ian Wells 0–5 Mark Davis

Group D

 James Wattana 5–2 Habib Subah
 Marvin Lim Chun Kiat 5–4 Tom Ford
 Joe Swail 5–3 Dene O'Kane
 Habib Subah 1–5 Tom Ford
 Joe Swail 5–1 James Wattana
 Dene O'Kane 5–3 Marvin Lim Chun Kiat
 Joe Swail 5–1 Habib Subah
 James Wattana 5–4 Tom Ford
 Habib Subah 3–5 Dene O'Kane
 Joe Swail 5–1 Marvin Lim Chun Kiat
 Habib Subah 5–4 Marvin Lim Chun Kiat
 Joe Swail 4–5 Tom Ford
 James Wattana 5–3 Dene O'Kane
 James Wattana 5–0 Marvin Lim Chun Kiat
 Dene O'Kane 0–5 Tom Ford

Group E

 Stuart Bingham  5–1 Zaw Tun
 Saleh Mohammad  5–3 Mike Dunn
 Atthasit Mahitthi 5–2 Zaw Tun
 Stuart Bingham  5–3 Mohammed Al Joker
 Atthasit Mahitthi 0–5 Saleh Mohammad 
 Mohammed Al Joker 2–5 Mike Dunn
 Zaw Tun 0–5 Saleh Mohammad 
 Stuart Bingham  4–5 Saleh Mohammad 
 Zaw Tun 4–5 Mohammed Al Joker
 Atthasit Mahitthi 5–1 Mike Dunn
 Zaw Tun 2–5 Mike Dunn
 Atthasit Mahitthi 5–3 Mohammed Al Joker
 Stuart Bingham  1–5 Mike Dunn
 Saleh Mohammad  5–4 Mohammed Al Joker
 Stuart Bingham  5–4 Atthasit Mahitthi

Group F

 Noppadon Noppachorn 5–3 Mohsen Abdullah Aziz
 Nigel Bond 5–2 Yutaka Fukuda
 Steve Mifsud 3–5 Jimmy Michie
 Noppadon Noppachorn 5–3 Jimmy Michie
 Steve Mifsud 5–3 Mohsen Abdullah Aziz
 Yutaka Fukuda 0–5 Mohsen Abdullah Aziz
 Nigel Bond 5–4 Noppadon Noppachorn
 Steve Mifsud 5–1 Yutaka Fukuda
 Mohsen Abdullah Aziz 2–5 Jimmy Michie
 Nigel Bond 5–0 Jimmy Michie
 Noppadon Noppachorn 3–5 Steve Mifsud
 Nigel Bond 5–2 Steve Mifsud
 Yutaka Fukuda 1–5 Jimmy Michie
 Nigel Bond 3–5 Mohsen Abdullah Aziz
 Noppadon Noppachorn 5–1 Yutaka Fukuda

Group G

 Manan Chandra 2–5 Ricky Walden
 Akani Songsermsawat 5–2 Matthew Selt
 Phaitoon Phonbun 5–1 Mohammed Shehab
  Matthew Selt 5–2 Manan Chandra
 Akani Songsermsawat 3–5 Ricky Walden
 Phaitoon Phonbun 5–4 Akani Songsermsawat
 Matthew Selt 1–5 Mohammed Shehab
 Matthew Selt 4–5 Ricky Walden
 Phaitoon Phonbun 5–3 Manan Chandra
 Akani Songsermsawat 4–5 Mohammed Shehab
 Phaitoon Phonbun 5–2 Ricky Walden
 Mohammed Shehab 0–5 Ricky Walden
 Akani Songsermsawat 1–5 Manan Chandra
 Phaitoon Phonbun 4–5 Matthew Selt
 Manan Chandra 5–3 Mohammed Shehab

Group H

 Itaro Santos 5–3 Muhammad Sajjad
 Dave Harold 5–4 Daniel Wells
 Suchart Phookang 5–3 Michael Holt
 Daniel Wells 5–2 Michael Holt
 Suchart Phookang 5–3 Muhammad Sajjad
 Suchart Phookang 3–5 Daniel Wells
 Muhammad Sajjad 5–3 Michael Holt
 Dave Harold 5–2 Itaro Santos
 Itaro Santos 3–5 Daniel Wells
 Dave Harold 5–0 Suchart Phookang
 Dave Harold 5–0 Muhammad Sajjad
 Suchart Phookang 2–5 Itaro Santos
 Dave Harold 2–5 Michael Holt
 Muhammad Sajjad 1–5 Daniel Wells
 Itaro Santos 4–5 Michael Holt

Knockout stage

Maximum breaks
(Note: a maximum break in six-red snooker is 75.)
 Saleh Mohammad (2 minutes 54 seconds)
 Mike Dunn (3 minutes 1 seconds)
 Michael Holt (3 minutes 31 seconds)
 Michael Holt (3 minutes 32 seconds)
 Mark Selby (3 minutes 42 seconds)
 Mohammed Shehab (4 minutes 13 seconds)

References

2008
Six-red Snooker International
Six-red Snooker International